Eduardo Malaquina (1936 – 9 April 2021) was an Uruguayan politician who served as a Senator.

References

1936 births
2021 deaths
Members of the Senate of Uruguay
20th-century Uruguayan politicians
21st-century Uruguayan politicians
Colorado Party (Uruguay) politicians